This is a list of Israel's ambassadors to Azerbaijan.

 Eliezer Yotvat, 1994–1997
 Arkady (Alek) Milman, 1997–1999 
 Eitan Naeh, 2001–2005
 Arthur Lenk, 2005–2009
 Michael Lavon-Lotem, 2009–2012
 Rafael Harpaz, 2012–2015
 Dan Stav, 2015–2019
 George Deek, 2019–

See also
List of Israeli ambassadors

External links 
 Website of the Embassy of Israel to Azerbaijan

Azerbaijan, List of
 
Israel